Basalt is a common igneous rock.

Basalt may also refer to:

Places

Australia 
 Basalt, Queensland, a locality in the Charters Towers Region, Australia
 Basalt, Victoria, a locality in Hepburn, Australia
 Basalt River, Queensland, Australia

North America 
 Basalt, Colorado, a city in the US
 Basalt, Idaho, a city in the US
 Basalt, Nevada, a populated place in the US
 Basalt Falls, British Columbia, Canada
 Basalt Headlands, Nova Scotia, Canada

Elsewhere 
 Basalt Island, in Hong Kong
 Basalt Lake, in Antarctica

Other uses 
 Basalt, a type of black pottery pioneered by the 18th-century potter Josiah Wedgwood
 Operation Basalt, the World War II raid
 Operation Basalt, the Syrian civil war 2018 Southern Syria offensive

See also 
 Bazalt